Bachia whitei, White's bachia, is a species of lizard in the family Gymnophthalmidae. It is endemic to Tobago.

References

Bachia
Reptiles of Trinidad and Tobago
Endemic fauna of Trinidad and Tobago
Reptiles described in 2019
Taxa named by John C. Murphy
Taxa named by Daniele Salvi
Taxa named by Joana L. Santos
Taxa named by Alvin L. Braswell
Taxa named by Stevland P. Charles
Taxa named by Amaél Borzée
Taxa named by Michael J. Jowers